The Drehmann sign describes a clinical test of examining orthopedic patients and is widely used in the functional check of the hip joint. 
It was first described by Gustav Drehmann (Breslau, 1869–1932).

The Drehmann sign is positive if an unavoidable passive external rotation of the hip occurs when performing a hip flexion. In addition, an internal rotation of the respective hip joint is either not possible or accompanied by pain when forcefully induced.

The positive Drehmann sign is a typical clinical feature in slipped capital femoral epiphysis (SCFE), the impingement syndrome of the acetabulum-hip,  or in osteoarthritis of the hip joint.

References 

Medical diagnosis
Orthopedics